Through the Waves is a 2018 South Korea morning soap opera starring Ah Young, Park Jung-wook, Jay Kim, Jang Jae-ho, Seo Ha, Noh Haeng-ha, Kim Jung-heon, and Jung Yoon-hye. It aired on KBS2 from February 12, 2018 to August 31, 2018.

It is the 44th and the final TV Novel series (13th in 2010s) of KBS. It is also the lowest-rated TV Novel series, averaging only 7.4% and hitting a peak of 10.4%, according to AGB Nielsen's nationwide ratings.

Plot 
This is a family drama which tells the story of a family of five women who lost their property and became separated after the war.

Cast

Main 
 Ah Young as Oh Bok-shil/Oh Se-ra, the only daughter in the Oh household who becomes a singer named Oh Se-ra in order to look for her missing father.
 Jo Ye-rin as young Oh Bok-shil
 Park Jung-wook as Han Kyung-ho, Bok-shil's childhood friend and Daeguk Construction employee who realizes his feelings for her.
 Park Ha-joon as young Han Kyung-ho
 Jay Kim as Cha Sang-pil, the chief executive officer of Lucky Entertainment and an orphan who becomes insecure of his position in the Hwang household that adopted him.
 Jang Jae-ho as Oh Jung-hoon, the eldest of the Oh brood who shoulders the burden of being the man of the household and fails in his dreams of becoming a lawyer.
 Kwon Mi-reu as young Oh Jung-hoon
 Seo Ha as Uhm Soon-young, Jung-hoon's girlfriend of four years whom he had to abandon to marry a rich woman.
 Noh Haeng-ha as Hwang Mi-jin, the daughter of construction magnate Hwang Chang-shik whom Jung-hoon marries to get a better chance in life.
 Lee Yoo-joo as young Hwang Mi-jin
 Kim Jung-heon as Oh Jung-tae, the second son of the Oh family who could not go to school and could only live a poor and violent life.
 Lee Hyun-bin as young Oh Jung-tae
 Jung Yoon-hye as Kim Choon-ja, the Oh siblings' childhood friend and neighbor who insistently clings onto her longtime crush, Jung-tae.

Supporting

Oh Family 
 Lee Kyung-jin as Lee Ok-boon, the mother of the Oh siblings who lost her husband during the war and was forced to make difficult decisions to survive.
 Ban Hyo-jung as Hong Ki-jun, the grandmother of the Oh siblings who lives with the guilt of losing her son's riches during the war and plunging their family into poverty.
 Lee Shi-hoo as Oh Jung-woo, the youngest of the Oh siblings whose leg becomes lame in a childhood accident.
 Jung Hyun-joon as young Oh Jung-woo

Sohyun-dong Neighbors 
 Kyun Oh-hyun as Han Cheon-sam, Kyung-ho's father who works as a musician for the Golden Carriage Cabaret.
 Lee Kyung-sil as Yang Mal-soon, Kyung-ho's mother who is a seamstress and holds a tight leash on the household.
 Jung Sung-ho as Kim Sang-man, Choon-ja's father who works for the government and helps the Oh family settle into the poor Seoul neighborhood of Sohyun-dong.

Daeguk Construction  
 Sunwoo Jae-duk as Hwang Chang-sik, the Chairman of Daeguk Construction whose wealth was secretly built on the stolen riches of the Oh family.
 Sung Hyun-ah as Cheon Geum-geum, Chang-shik's nosy and haughty wife.

Golden Carriage Cabaret 
 Lee Joo-hyun as Cho Dong-chul, chief executive officer of Golden Carriage Cabaret who runs a gang of thugs and does dirty work for Hwang Chang-shik.
 Park Seon-young as Gu Mi-shim, Soon-young's aunt who initially opposes her relationship with Jung-hoon.
 Song Young-jae as Johnny Kim, Han Cheon-sam's musical partner who influences his gambling addiction.
 Nam Tae-woo as Park Yong-chil, Dong-chul's lackey.

Lucky Entertainment 
 Kim Min-seon as Oh Hae-rin, the daughter of a rich ally of Hwang Chang-shik and Bok-shil's fellow singer trainee who has a crush on Kyung-ho.
 Seo Jae-won as Heo Jin-gyu, Sang-pil's employee.

Extended 
 Kim Kwang-tae as 
 Lee Jin-mok
 Jo Hee
 Kang Jae-eun
 Lee Yoon-sang
 Goo Jung-rim
 Lee Ye-rin

Original soundtrack

Part 1

Part 2

Part 3

Ratings 
In this table,  represent the lowest ratings and  represent the highest ratings.
NR denotes that the drama did not rank in the top 20 daily programs on that date.

Notes

References

External links
  

Korean Broadcasting System television dramas
Korean-language television shows
2018 South Korean television series debuts
2018 South Korean television series endings